Willie du Plessis may refer to:

 Willie du Plessis (rugby union, born 1955), a South African international rugby union player
 Willie du Plessis (rugby union, born 1990), a South African rugby union player